The 1987–88 Edmonton Oilers season was the Oilers' ninth season in the NHL, and they were coming off a Stanley Cup championship against the Philadelphia Flyers the previous season, which was their third Stanley Cup in the past 4 seasons.  This was the first time since 1980–81 that the Oilers did not win the division, break the 100 point barrier, or lead the NHL in goals.

Wayne Gretzky led the team with 149 points (sitting out 16 games with a knee injury), his lowest point total since his rookie season in 1979–80, and the first time since then that he failed to lead the NHL in scoring. Jari Kurri and Craig Simpson, who the Oilers acquired from the Pittsburgh Penguins during the season, led the team in goals with 43, and Mark Messier set a career high with 111 points. With Paul Coffey being traded during the season to the Penguins, Steve Smith stepped up and led Oilers defense with 55 points and have a team record 286 penalty minutes.

In goal, Grant Fuhr appeared in 75 of the 80 Oilers games, winning a career high 40 games and getting 4 shutouts, while posting a 3.43 GAA and becoming the first Oilers goalie to win the Vezina Trophy. Goalie Andy Moog demanded to be traded from the Oilers, and at the trading deadline, Edmonton dealt Moog and left wing Moe Lemay to the Boston Bruins for goaltender Bill Ranford, left wing Geoff Courtnall, right wing Alan May, and a second-round draft pick in the 1988 NHL Entry Draft.

Season standings

Schedule and results

Playoffs
In the playoffs, the Oilers started off by defeating the Winnipeg Jets in 5 games, and faced their Battle of Alberta rivals, the Calgary Flames in the Smythe Division finals. The Flames ended the Oilers' streak of six straight division titles by finishing six points ahead of Edmonton during the regular season and were favoured to win the series, however, the Oilers quickly swept Calgary to advance to the Campbell Conference finals, against the Detroit Red Wings. Edmonton had no problem getting past Detroit, winning the series in five games, and faced the Boston Bruins in the Stanley Cup Finals. The Oilers continued to dominate, sweeping Boston despite having to play 5 games (game 4 was cancelled midway through the third period with the score tied at 3 due to a power failure at the Boston Garden) to win their fourth Stanley Cup in 5 years. Grant Fuhr set an NHL record by winning 16 playoff games, while Wayne Gretzky took home the Conn Smythe Trophy after earning a league high 43 playoff points.

Season stats

Scoring leaders

Goaltending

Playoff stats

Scoring leaders

Goaltending

Awards and Records

Awards

Records
 1,050: A new NHL record for most assists in a career by Wayne Gretzky on Mar 1, 1988.
 286: An Oilers record for most penalty minutes in a single season by Steve Smith.
266: A new Oilers record for most penalty minutes in a single season by a defenceman by Steve Smith on ???, 1988.
 51: A new NHL record for most career even strength goals in a playoffs by Jari Kurri on ???, 1988.
 40: An Oilers record for most wins in a single season by Grant Fuhr.
34: A new Oilers record for most wins in a single season by Grant Fuhr on February 23, 1988.
 31: A new NHL record for most assists in a playoffs by Wayne Gretzky on May 26, 1988.

Milestones

Transactions

Trades

Free agents

Draft picks
Edmonton's draft picks at the 1987 NHL Entry Draft. The Oilers attempted to select Dave Wensley in the second round of the 1987 NHL Supplemental Draft, but the claim was ruled invalid since Wensley entered school after age 20 and therefore did not meet eligibility requirements.

References

Further reading
 SHRP Sports
 The Internet Hockey Database
 National Hockey League Guide & Record Book 2007

Edmonton Oilers season, 1987-88
Edmonton Oilers season, 1987-88
Edmon
Edmonton Oilers seasons
Stanley Cup championship seasons
Western Conference (NHL) championship seasons